Mount Pocono is a borough in Monroe County, Pennsylvania. It is located nearly centered in the southernmost county of five in the northeastern corner that are part of the Pocono Mountains.  The borough serves as a local highway nexus, and sees a lot of tourist traffic making use of resources in the region. As of the 2020 census, the borough population was 3,083 residents.

Geography
Mount Pocono is located at  (41.123012, −75.359574), and is nearly centered in Monroe County—the most southerly and centered county of the five counties containing portions of the Pocono Mountains of Northeastern Pennsylvania.  The region's valleys includes left bank tributaries of the Lehigh River in the southern half, and as the mountain ranges narrow closer to New York, are instead drained by left bank tributaries of the Susquehanna River.  To the east, all Poconos ridge lines drain into the Delaware River or right bank tributaries of the Delaware.

According to the U.S. Census Bureau, the borough has a total area of 3.5 square miles (9.0 km2), all of it land.

Demographics

As of the census of 2010, there were 3,170 people, 1,225 households, and 793 families residing in the borough. The population density was 792.2 people per square mile (306.0/km2). There were 1,417 housing units at an average density of 358.0 per square mile (138.3/km2). The racial makeup of the borough was 58.6% White, 18.6% Black or African American, 0.2% Native American, 2.2% Asian, 0.1% Pacific Islander, 0.2% from other races, and 2.4% from two or more races. Hispanic or Latino of any race were 17.7% of the population.

There were 1,225 households, out of which 32.0% had children under the age of 18 living with them, 43.8% were married couples living together, 16.0% had a female householder with no husband present, and 35.3% were non-families. Of all households 20.9% were made up of individuals, and 29.6% had someone living alone who was 65 years of age or older. The average household size was 2.58 and the average family size was 3.22.

In the borough, the population was spread out, with 25.5% under the age of 18, and 14.8% who were 65 years of age or older. The median age was 39.0 years.

Public education
Pocono Mountain School District (PMSD) is the public school system for students living in Mount Pocono. PMSD is divided into two parts, the East and the West districts. Mount Pocono is the East district, comprising Pocono Mountain East High School for grades 9 - 12, Pocono Mountain East Junior High School serving students in the seventh and eighth grades,  Swiftwater Intermediate School for grades 4, 5, and 6, and students from kindergarten through third grade attend the Swiftwater Elementary Center.  The PMSD also offers the PMSD Cyber Program, a comprehensive cyber school alternative for grades k-12. The program is free to all students in the district

History
Early 19th-century settlers used the area for lumbering. The "New Mount Pocono" post office was established in 1848. The town's name was changed in 1864 to "Forks", because of its five-way intersection where Pennsylvania Route 611 and Pennsylvania Route 940 cross and Pennsylvania Route 196 begins. The name was changed again in 1886 to "Mount Pocono". The Delaware, Lackawanna and Western Railroad provided transportation from New York City and Philadelphia. Mount Pocono quickly developed as a summer resort, advertising clean mountain air, spring water, luxury hotels and excellent fishing.

Initially, the town was part of Coolbaugh Township. In 1927, Mount Pocono borough was incorporated on its own.

The boom times lasted into the mid-20th century. Most of the resort hotels burned or closed, and passenger service to the town ended in 1965.

Mount Airy Lodge in nearby Paradise Township grew into an 895-room mega-resort. In the mid- and late-20th century it was a popular honeymoon destination, famous for its heart-shaped bathtubs. It closed in 2001, and was demolished. Casino gambling in Pennsylvania became legal in 2004. Mount Airy Casino Resort was built on the Mount Airy Lodge's lakeside site, and opened in 2007.

Resort hotels
 Pine Hill Lodge (1875). Still in business. 11 guest rooms.)
 Pocono Mountain House (1878, burned 1973), 250 guest rooms.
 Princess Poconita Resort (1880). Now Whispering Hills Motel.
 Pocohasset House (demolished 1938), 100 guest rooms.
 Ontwood Resort (c. 1890s, burned 1979), 150 guest rooms.
 Mount Pleasant House (burned 1968), 150 guests.
 Mount Airy Lodge (1898, closed 2001, demolished). At its peak in the 1960s, the hotel had 895 guest rooms.
 Montanesca Hotel (1901, burned 1911), 125 guest rooms.
 The Meadowside (burned 1926).
 Hawthorne Inn (1909, demolished).
 Strickland's Mountain Inn (c. 1900, demolished 2007). Began as The Elvin, sold to Strickland in 1945.
 Devonshire Pines (1912, demolished), 200 guest rooms.
 The Belmont (burned 1963).

Currently, Mount Pocono serves as the commercial center for the northern part of Monroe County.  Stores from national and regional chains such as Lowe's, Walmart, Weis Markets, and others are in the Borough.  Local businesses include the Casino Theatre, the Village Trader, the Pioneer Diner.  Many businesses are members of the Mount Pocono Association (formerly, the Mount Pocono Business Association).

Transportation

Roads and highways

Pennsylvania Route 196, Pennsylvania Route 611 and Pennsylvania Route 940 are the numbered highways serving Mount Pocono. PA 940 follows a southwest-northeast alignment through the center of the borough. PA 611 follows a northwest-southeast alignment through the middle of the borough. Finally, PA 196 begins at the intersection of PA 611 and PA 940 and heads north through the northern portion of the borough.

Railroad

The main line of the Delaware, Lackawanna and Western Railroad passed through the southern end of the borough, providing access from New York City via the terminal at Hoboken, New Jersey. A passenger station was built at the crossing of Pennsylvania Route 611 in 1886. Most of the station was demolished in 1937 when the highway was widened. Regular passenger service to the borough ended in 1965. The D., L. & W. tracks now carry freight trains of the Delaware-Lackawanna Railroad and an occasional excursion train from Steamtown National Historic Site.

Bus
The Monroe County Transit Authority (MCTA) serves Monroe County with five bus routes.  The Authority's Blue Route serves Mount Pocono's Main Street (Pocono Blvd.) with northbound service to Tobyhanna and southbound service to Tannersville and the Stroud Mall.  Connections to other MCTA routes are provided at the Stroud Mall. Martz Trailways and Greyhound Lines provide intercity bus service to Mount Pocono at the Martz Express bus station, with Martz Trailways connecting Mount Pocono with the Port Authority Bus Terminal in New York City and Greyhound Lines connecting Mount Pocono with the Philadelphia Greyhound Terminal in Philadelphia and Scranton.

Air
Pocono Mountains Municipal Airport is located two miles north of the borough.

Media 
The Pocono Record is a daily newspaper in the Poconos. Its coverage area centers on Stroudsburg and East Stroudsburg and will occasionally cover Mount Pocono news. It currently has fewer than 60 subscribers in Mount Pocono. It is part of the Gannett/USA Today network.

The Pocono Plateau is a publication of the Journal Newspapers located in White Haven, Pennsylvania. It has covered Tobyhanna Township, Coolbaugh Township, and Mount Pocono Borough for over twenty years. The community newspaper is published monthly or bi-monthly at various times of the year and is distributed free at grocery stores and restaurants in the area.

The Boro community newspaper was originally established in 2018 as an online news and information site for Mount Pocono Borough residents. In February 2020, it began printing a monthly newspaper. In July 2020, it expanded coverage to include adjacent Coolbaugh and Tobyhanna Townships. The Boro* is delivered by mail to every home and business in Mount Pocono and distributed at nearly 100 controlled distribution sites throughout the area. Starting in September 2020 it began publishing every other week as The Boro & Towne News and expanded mailing to include residents of Tobyhanna and Coolbaugh.

Climate

According to the Trewartha climate classification system, Mount Pocono has a temperate Continental climate (Dc) with warm summers (b), cold winters (o) and year-around precipitation (Dcbo). Dcbo climates are characterized by at least one month having an average mean temperature ≤ , four to seven months with an average mean temperature ≥ , all months with an average mean temperature <  and no significant precipitation difference between seasons. Although most summer days are comfortably humid in Mount Pocono, episodes of heat and high humidity can occur, with heat index values > . Since 1981, the highest air temperature has been  on July 22, 2011, and the highest daily average mean dew point has been , on August 1, 2006. July is the peak month for thunderstorm activity, which correlates with the average warmest month of the year. The average wettest month is October, with added rainfall from tropical storm remnants during the Atlantic hurricane season. Since 1981, the wettest calendar day has been 6.81 inches (173 mm), on September 30, 2010. Since 1981, the coldest air temperature has been , on January 21, 1994. Episodes of extreme cold and wind can occur, with wind chill values < . The average snowiest month is January which correlates with the average coldest month of the year. Ice storms and large snowstorms depositing ≥ 12 inches (30 cm) of snow occur nearly every year, particularly during nor’easters from December through March.

Ecology
According to the A. W. Kuchler U.S. potential natural vegetation types, Mount Pocono would have a dominant vegetation type of Northern Hardwood (106) with a dominant vegetation form of Northern hardwood forest (26). The peak spring bloom typically occurs in early-May and peak fall color usually occurs in early-October.

See also
Casino Theatre (Mount Pocono, Pennsylvania)

References

External links 
 

1927 establishments in Pennsylvania
Boroughs in Monroe County, Pennsylvania
Pocono Mountains
Populated places established in 1927